Kenmare is a city in Ward County, North Dakota, United States. The population was 961 at the 2020 census.  Kenmare is part of the Minot Micropolitan Statistical Area.

History

Kenmare was platted in 1897. The city most likely was named after Kenmare, in Ireland.

Geography
Kenmare is located at  (48.675015, −102.078709).

Demographics

2010 census
As of the census of 2010, there were 1,096 people, 480 households, and 281 families living in the city. The racial makeup of the city was 95.9% White, 0.2% African American, 0.6% Native American, 0.7% Asian, 1.2% from other races, and 1.4% from two or more races. Hispanic or Latino of any race were 2.6% of the population.

There were 480 households, of which 25.0% had children under the age of 18 living with them, 48.8% were married couples living together, 6.5% had a female householder with no husband present, 3.3% had a male householder with no wife present, and 41.5% were non-families. 36.7% of all households were made up of individuals, and 18.7% had someone living alone who was 65 years of age or older. The average household size was 2.18 and the average family size was 2.85.

The median age in the city was 46.7 years. 21.4% of residents were under the age of 18; 6.2% were between the ages of 18 and 24; 19.5% were from 25 to 44; 29.2% were from 45 to 64; and 23.6% were 65 years of age or older. The gender makeup of the city was 50.5% male and 49.5% female.

2000 census
As of the census of 2000, there were 1,081 people, 468 households, and 278 families living in the city. The population density was 872.8 people per square mile (336.6/km2). There were 553 housing units at an average density of 446.5 per square mile (172.2/km2). The racial makeup of the city was 98.33% White, 0.56% Native American, 0.28% Asian, 0.09% from other races, and 0.74% from two or more races. Hispanic or Latino of any race were 0.19% of the population.

There were 468 households, out of which 23.3% had children under the age of 18 living with them, 50.6% were married couples living together, 6.0% had a female householder with no husband present, and 40.4% were non-families. 38.9% of all households were made up of individuals, and 22.4% had someone living alone who was 65 years of age or older. The average household size was 2.15 and the average family size was 2.85.

In the city, the population was spread out, with 19.9% under the age of 18, 5.2% from 18 to 24, 22.2% from 25 to 44, 22.0% from 45 to 64, and 30.7% who were 65 years of age or older. The median age was 47 years. For every 100 females, there were 93.0 males. For every 100 females age 18 and over, there were 85.0 males.

The median income for a household in the city was $30,057, and the median income for a family was $40,125. Males had a median income of $27,031 versus $17,826 for females. The per capita income for the city was $15,428. About 10.0% of families and 10.7% of the population were below the poverty line, including 11.1% of those under age 18 and 11.1% of those age 65 or over.

Climate
This climatic region is typified by large seasonal temperature differences, with warm to hot (and often humid) summers and cold (sometimes severely cold) winters.  According to the Köppen Climate Classification system, Kenmare has a humid continental climate, abbreviated "Dfb" on climate maps.

References

External links
Welcome to Kenmare, North Dakota : "home of the Danish Mill." (1978) from the Digital Horizons website

Cities in North Dakota
Cities in Ward County, North Dakota
Populated places established in 1897
Minot, North Dakota micropolitan area
1897 establishments in North Dakota